The MD-2-related lipid-recognition (ML) domain is implicated in lipid recognition, particularly in the recognition of pathogen related products. It has an immunoglobulin-like beta-sandwich fold similar to that of immunoglobulin E-set domains. This domain is present in the following proteins:

 Epididymal secretory protein E1 (also known as Niemann-Pick C2 protein), which is known to bind cholesterol. Niemann-Pick disease type C2 is a fatal hereditary disease characterised by accumulation of low-density lipoprotein-derived cholesterol in lysosomes.
 House dust mite allergen proteins such as Der f 2 from Dermatophagoides farinae and Der p 2 from Dermatophagoides pteronyssinus.

Human proteins containing this domain 
LY86;      LY96;      MMD-1;

References

Protein domains
Protein families